Cynarina lacrymalis is a species of stony coral in the family Lobophylliidae. It is variously known as the flat cup coral, solitary cup coral, button coral, doughnut coral, or cat's eye coral. It is found in the western Indo-Pacific Ocean and is sometimes kept in reef aquaria.

Description

Cynarina lacrymalis is a large, solitary coral with a single polyp nestling in a corallite, the stony cup it has secreted. It is cylindrical with a round or oval upper surface. It is usually fixed to rock but has a pointed base and can be embedded in sand or survive unattached. There are about twenty broad white radially arranged septa (ridges) joined to the corallite wall, with secondary septa between. They have large, rounded lobes and the central axial structure (columella) in the corallite is short and broad. The septa can be seen through the transparent, fleshy mantle which contains symbiotic flagellates known as zooxanthellae which give the coral its colour. This is usually pale brown or green, sometimes with a contrasting oral disc, but also sometimes pinkish or bluish. The colour depends on which species of zooxanthella take up residence. The coral has the ability to change its surface from glossy to dull but it is unclear why it does this. At night, when the polyp extends its many tentacles to feed, the coral resembles a sea anemone.

Distribution and habitat
Cynarina lacrymalis is found in the Red Sea and Gulf of Aden, the east coast of Africa and the Seychelles. It is also known from Japan, Indonesia and northern and eastern Australia. It is found on shallow reefs and sandy seabeds with moderate water flow, down to depths of

Biology
This coral orientates itself so that its cup surface is parallel to the surface to which it is fastened and it sways with the water movement. During the day, the mantle tissues absorb water and swell up. This increases the area exposed to the light and may double the coral's diameter. The zooxanthellae are photosynthetic and use sunlight to create organic compounds. These provide most of the coral's energy needs. However, during the night, the tentacles of the polyp are extended to trap planktonic particles floating past and these supplement the nutrition it obtains from photosynthesis.

This coral is a hermaphrodite and reproduces by releasing eggs and sperm into the water where fertilisation takes place. The planula larvae which emerge from the eggs are planktonic and eventually settle on the seabed to undergo metamorphosis into juvenile polyps. Under conditions of poor light, the coral sometimes reproduces asexually, part of the disc becoming detached and growing into a new individual.

Use in aquaria
Cynarina lacrymalis is a hardy coral, tolerant of various environmental conditions, and is suitable for use in a mixed aquarium. It should be firmly secured because when it is swollen with water it becomes heavy. It needs moderate light to provide conditions where its zooxanthellae can flourish and should also be target fed with brine shrimps, cyclops, rotifers, daphnia or other zooplankton.

References

Lobophylliidae